Notes Falling Slow is a box set by the Canadian alt-country band Cowboy Junkies, containing remastered version of the 2001 album Open, the 2004 album One Soul Now, and the 2007 album At the End of Paths Taken on the first three discs, plus songs worked on during the creation of the three albums but not included. Some of the tracks were not previously completed, some were not demoed, and others were cut but did not make the final set. All these tracks have been newly recorded for this box set and included on the final disc, effectively creating a new Cowboy Junkies album.

Track listing

References

External links 

2015 compilation albums
Cowboy Junkies albums
Latent Recordings albums